In computing,  is the key combination of the control key and a key usually labeled "x" (lower-case letter ex), typically used to cut selected text and save it to the clipboard ready to paste elsewhere.  Conventionally, the key combination is produced by holding down  and  simultaneously.  To avoid having to press multiple keys simultaneously, the key combination is, on some systems, entered by first pushing the control key and then the X key.

Text editing
In many software applications on Windows and the X Window System  can be used to cut highlighted mutable text to the clipboard. On Mac OS X  has an analogous function. The key combination was one of a handful of keyboard sequences chosen by the program designers at Xerox PARC to control text editing.

Interaction style
In computer science, this style of interaction is referred to as indirect manipulation, a human–computer interaction style, as opposed to direct manipulation. Direct manipulation is a term introduced by Ben Shneiderman in 1982 within the context of office applications and the desktop metaphor.

Indirect manipulation has a higher level of abstraction compared to direct manipulation, because first one must select the item (such as character, word, paragraph or icon) that one wants to edit and then give the command; in this case, the cut command by pressing the key combination

References

See also 
 Control-C
 Control-V
 Control-Z
 Keyboard shortcut

Computer keys